Balpınar can refer to:

 Balpınar, Batman
 Balpınar, Elâzığ